The Abell catalogue is a catalogue of approximately 4,000 galaxy clusters with at least 30 members, almost complete to a redshift of z = 0.2. It was originally compiled by the American astronomer George O. Abell in 1958 using plates from POSS, and extended to the southern hemisphere by Abell, Corwin  and Olowin in 1987. The name "Abell" is also commonly used as a designation for objects he compiled in a catalogue of 86 planetary nebulae in 1966. The proper designation for the galaxy clusters is ACO, as in "ACO 13", while the planetary-nebula designation is the single letter A, as in "A 39".

1–1999

2000–4076

Southern catalogue S1–S1174

See also
 Lists of astronomical objects
 List of galaxy groups and clusters

References

External links
Abell's 1958 paper and catalog
Abell, Corwin and Olowin's 1989 paper and catalog
Electronic form of the Abell catalog

 
Lists of astronomical objects